Rudolf Diwald was a male Austrian international table tennis player.

He won a bronze medal at the 1948 World Table Tennis Championships in the Swaythling Cup with Heinrich Bednar, Otto Eckl, Heribert Just and Herbert Wunsch.

See also
 List of table tennis players
 List of World Table Tennis Championships medalists

References

Austrian male table tennis players
World Table Tennis Championships medalists